Saptha iridopa is a moth in the family Choreutidae. It was described by Edward Meyrick in 1907. It is found on the Solomon Islands.

References

Choreutidae
Moths described in 1907